South Korea has a relatively unified and integrated approach to law enforcement. For example, the National Police Agency (NPA) provides all general policing services throughout the country. Due to the unitary system, local police organizations are directly under the NPA.

This differs from the situation in many countries such as France, where policing is split between the National Police and Gendarmerie, or such as the United States, which have a layered system of national, state/regional, and/or local law enforcement organizations.

However, South Korea has several independent agencies that only enforce a specific law or laws—for example, the Ministry of Justice and Ministry of Economy and Finance have their own enforcement organizations for either border control, Customs or taxation, respectively. However, they are not formally called police.

The Police of the Republic of Korea''' (the National Police Agency of the Republic of Korea) protect Republic of Korea people's lives, bodies and property, prevent, suppress, and investigate crimes, guard major facilities, guard key factors, and counter-espionage. Conducting counterterrorism operations, collecting, preparing, and distributing security information, controlling traffic and preventing harm, seeking international cooperation with foreign government agencies and international organizations, and other duties to maintain public peace and order It refers to an organization in charge of security, safety, pollution control, and investigation of incidents at sea.

 History 

 Before the Koryo era 
Before the Koryo era , there were many records about criminal law, but there were no accurate records about the police. Some people speculate that there is no complete differentiation with government organizations or military organizations.

 Korean era 
There was a grape hall(An ancient judicial department) in Korea, and a grape captain was appointed to take charge of police affairs. In 1835, the organization was expanded to the left and right grape halls. In 1884, the Left and Right Podo Offices were abolished, and the police departmentwas newly established to take charge of public order within the capital. Local police affairs were managed from within.

 Korean Empire 
The modern police system was introduced before and after the establishment of Korean Empire in 1897. In 1899, the police chief was promoted to the position of police minister, who was in charge of public security work throughout the country. In 1901, it was reorganized into an internal police department, and the interior minister was in charge of police work.

 Japanese imperialist occupation period 
In the 1910s, during the Japanese imperialist occupation, the police organization was directly under the authority, the deputy governor of the DPRK. The central government had a police inspector general's department and local police departments. Police Superintendent The military police commander, who is not interfered by the Japanese military police commander, also serves as the police superintendent, supervising the police work on the Korean peninsula. The Ministry of Police Supervision directly governs the Ministry of Beijing.

The provincial police ministers are concurrently the provincial gendarmerie captains, who are responsible for the police affairs in their provinces. The chief of police is responsible for the police affairs of military units, but the sub-captains of military police and sub-captains of military police have the same authority as the chief of police, and are responsible for areas beyond the authority of the chief of police. The cotton unit has a pure social finance office, a pure social police station, a military police dispatch office and a military police business office to assist police affairs. Generally, the police are deployed in areas that mainly need to maintain order, such as the port of departure, while the military police are deployed in important military places or border areas, where there are militia.

In the 1920s, during the Japanese occupation, the police organization changed from military police to ordinary police. The General Police Supervision Department and the provincial police departments were abolished, and the police departments under the provincial governor exercised police power. At the same time of setting up military police detachment or military police detachment, police stations are also set up in areas where there are no police stations, and the principle of setting up a police station in a department or county and a resident station on one side is formulated. With the need for more policemen, a police training workshop was set up.

In order to carry out Japan's war of aggression, the control of the Korean Peninsula  was strengthened, and the police organization was also expanded. The police were responsible for national defense, air defense, economic control, listening to the public's trends, media guidance and national health care, which lasted until the liberation of the Korean Peninsula.

The Provisional Government of the Republic of Korea established by the March 1st Movement in 1919 is a police bureau under the Ministry of the Interior which performs police functions. The first police chief was recommended by Interior Minister An Changhao, and Jin Jiu was elected on 12 August 1919. The police bureau was responsible for intelligence and supervision, police work, and arrested Japanese imperialist spies. Jin Jiu appointed Lu Shungen as the guard minister, and employed most young Han people, including more than 20 guards. Jin Jiu not only supervised the police work as the police chief, but also tried as the presiding judge in the interim government without courts. Jin Jiu, the police chief, expelled Sun Yujia and Jiang Linyu, who had been a spy of Japanese imperialism, shot and killed Jin Daoshun, who had been a spy of Japanese consulate, and arrested and executed Huang Heshan, who tried to poison independence activists.

 Republic of Korea 

After liberation on August 15, 1945, the Police Department was established in the US Military Government and the police departments were established in each province on October 21. In 1946, the Police Department was reorganized into the Police Department, and each provincial police department was reorganized into the provincial police office, and the Railway Provincial Police Agency was established. In September 1948, police authority was transferred from the US Military Government to the Korean government, and as the National Security Bureau was established under the Ministry of Home Affairs, each city and provincial police office was changed to the National Police Agency.

In 1949, the Railway District Police Agency was reduced to the Railway Police Unit, and the Coast Guard was established in 1953 December 23. In 1963, when the railroad police force was abolished, it was transferred to the Transportation Bureau. In 1974, the Public Security Bureau became the Security Headquarters, and in 1991, as the Security Headquarters was expanded to the National Police Agency, the Metropolitan Police Agency was changed to the Local Police Agency. In 1996, the Korea Coast Guard was separated as an organization under the Ministry of Maritime Affairs and Fisheries.

 Organization 
Organizations in charge of police work in the Republic of Korea are Korea Coast Guard and its affiliated agencies, Korea Coast Guard and its affiliated agencies, Korea Ministry of Land, Infrastructure and Transport railway police ; In addition, through the Special Judicial Police Act, public officials who perform police duties related to related duties are designated to carry out public order maintenance and enforcement duties.

 Korean police
Class of police civil servants
It is divided into 11 national positions and 8 local positions.

 Non-cadre level (patrol, sheriff (rank) | sheriff, sergeant) 
 Patrol (Grade 9), Sheriff (Grade 8), Sergeant (Grade 7)
 It is in the shape of a hibiscus flower bud wrapped with 2 hibiscus leaves. It is called the root of the police as a public security practitioner who performs the tasks closest to the nationals in places such as first-line teams and police mobile teams.
 The Tai Theater at the bottom is the source of all things, symbolizing "the people of the Republic of Korea". The hibiscus flower buds piled up with petals express the hope and possibility of blooming into hibiscus flowers. It refers to the police who have the hope and possibility of blooming into hibiscus flowers through unremitting efforts while earnestly performing the basic police tasks of protecting national lives and property at the front line of public security.

 Middle-level cadres (inspector, inspector, police, chief police)
 Inspector, Inspector (Grade 6), Police (Grade 5), Chief Police (Grade 4)
 The hibiscus flower of Thai Theater is placed in the center.
Earth patrol leader of university, director of police station, chief of police station, practical staff of local office of police department.
Captain of the earth, chief instrument officer and team leader of the police station, and monitor of the local hall of the police department.
Chief of police department and director of local department of police department.
Chief of police and chief of local department of police department.
 The Thai Theater in the center is the source of all things, symbolizing the Republic of Korea and the people. The hibiscus leaf wrapped around it refers to the "middle police cadre" in the most central position, and refers to the police who perform the police task of defending the country and serving the people most actively in the middle position of the police organization, and at the same time play the central role of the police organization.

 Senior cadres police officer, sheriff, sheriff, sense of security, sheriff)
 Police Officer (Level 3), Magistrate (Level 2), Sense of Public Security (Level 1), Superintendent of Public Security (Deputy Minister)
 Surround the hibiscus class leader with five horns, symbolizing the big shape of hibiscus.
The deputy head of the local office, the head of the Gyeonggi local office in Busan, Seoul, and the police chiefs and deliberation officers of the police department in five strongholds, including the Matsuura City Inspectorate.
Director of local police department, director of police education, principal of central police school and director of police department.
Minister of Investigation, Deputy Director of Police Department, Chief of Gyeonggi Local Police in Busan, Seoul,
Police chief
Chief of police.
 The class leader said that on the circumference of the hibiscus where the Thai Theater is placed in the center, on the circumference of the Taiji hibiscus where five identical hibiscus are connected at five angles, five identical hibiscus are connected at five angles. Tai Theater, located in the center of the hibiscus in Taiji, is the source of all things, symbolizing "the Republic of Korea and the people". The five hibiscus flowers wrapped around it are arranged in five corners and sublimated into a big shape, which means the highest class of the police organization. The five corners of Tai Chi hibiscus are "loyalty , god , phosphorus ,and dragon  "refers to five kinds of police-oriented value concepts. On this basis, the police head who accepts the nation and the country upwards and acts as the tractor of the police organization downwards.
The same grade applies to the police department and the marine police department.

Local posts are classes with the prefix "autonomy" for each class, and Jeju Special Autonomy is also a class that only exists in the autonomous police corps. Starting from the patrol, the slope is a real flower bud wrapped with two real petals. From the longitude and latitude to the total longitude, it is a real flower. The military attache puts a theater on the robe platform and puts 50 cents of real flowers.

 Appointment of police officers 

The process of hiring as a police officer in Korea is as follows. In order to become a career police officer, you must have a class 1 ordinary driver's license.
 Bar Exam, Administrative Examination — Level 5 Public Recruitment (Administration) Special Recruitment - In this case, a written test is required. Test subjects are Bar Exam Passers Korean History, Public Administration, Administrative Examination — Level 5 Public Recruitment (Administration) Passers Korean History, Criminal Law, Criminal Procedure Law. The rank of appointment is a correction. As Police, they become the highest-class resource among the selected personnel.
 Police Academy- Upon graduation, you will be appointed as a lieutenant.
 Police officer candidates - In the past, they were trained at the National Police Academy, but since 2010, they have been transferred to the Police Human Resources Development Institute (then the Police Education Institute). It is the oldest police officer training system in Korea, and like Police Academy, they are appointed as lieutenants.
 Police Officer Recruitment - In addition to the open recruitment exam, you will be appointed as a police officer after going through the Department of Police Administration, riot police discharged person special recruitment among 4-year universities.

 Gender equality policy 
As of April 29, 2018, about 13,000 female police officers and 3,000 female general administrative positions in the National Police Agency are working at the National Police Agency. This corresponds to 10.8% of all police officers. However, as of July 28, 2018, there are 16 high-ranking female police officers of Superintendent or higher, and there is only one female police officer in the current position Superintendent of Police or higher. In response, the National Police Agency abolished the gender restriction ratio when recruiting Police Academy new students and hiring police executive candidates, and is expected to eliminate gender discrimination in police officer recruitment in the future.

 Police Equipment 
 Mobility Equipment 
Korean police use various mobile devices to respond to security demands. In general, a 5-seater sedan is used, but in the case of mountainous or island areas, a sports utility vehicle is also used. In addition, motorcycles are used for quick site movement, and rotary wing aircraft are operated for aerial operations. In addition, buses are used to transport police officers in large numbers, ambulances are used to transport injured police officers, and restaurant vehicles and sanitation vehicles are operated for other conveniences.

The Korea Coast Guard operates 35 large ships, 39 medium ships, 110 small ships, 139 special ships, 6 fixed-wing ships, and 18 rotary-wing ships in order to respond to security demands at sea.

 Suppression Equipment 
Currently, South Korean police are allowed to carry 38-caliber pistols during operations. According to official data from the National Police Agency, S&W (Smith & Wesson) Model 10 is to be used. However, the Smith & Wesson Model 10 is outdated, so nowadays there is a trend to increase the anti-incident pressure by using the Model 60, which has a reduced barrel and weight and uses 357 Magnum bullets.

 case related 
 Civilian massacres during the Korean War 
Before the outbreak of the Korean War, the police cooperated with the Korean People's Guerrilla Army in the process of fighting with the Korean People's Guerrilla Army in Jeju Island, where （4·3 Incident） occurred, and in areas where （Yeosu·Suncheon Incident） occurred. Massacre civilians suspected of having done so. Right after the war broke out, in the process of retreating, prison inmates and （All-National Association—All-National Association members）were slaughtered, and after restoration, civilians suspected of collaborating with the Korean People's Army were slaughtered.

 Oppression related to the democratization movement 

The police played a role in suppressing the democratization movement during First Republic and Fifth Republic. At the time of (3·15 Masan Uprising), the police fired at the protesters, killing 7 people, Kim Joo-yeol's body was abandoned, and (4.19 Revolution) also fired at the protesters As a result, 185 people died. (Bucheon Police Station Sexual Torture Incident) and (Park Jong-cheol's Torture and Death Case).

 Ssangyong Motor Dispute Suppression 

List of law enforcement organizations
 Ministry of the Interior and Safety
 National Police Agency
 Provincial Police Agencies: Seoul, Busan, Daegu, Incheon, Daejeon, Gwangju, Ulsan, Gyeonggi Nambu, Gyeonggi Bukbu, Gangwon, Chungbuk, Chungnam, Jeonbuk, Jeonnam, Gyeongbuk, Gyeongnam, Jeju
 Ministry of Economy and Finance
 National Tax Service
 Investigation Bureau
 International Taxation Bureau
 Korea Customs Service
 Audit Policy Bureau
 Investigation and Surveillance Bureau
 Information Management and International Affairs Bureau
 Seoul Metropolitan Government
 38 Tax Collection Division
 Ministry of Land, Infrastructure and Transport
 Railway Police
 Government of Jeju Special Self-Governing Province
 Jeju Municipal Police (autonomous)
 Ministry of Maritime Affairs and Fisheries
 Korea Coast Guard (KCG; Korean: 해양경찰청; Sino-Korean word: 海洋警察廳, Revised Romanization: Haeyang-gyeongchal-cheong, literally translates to the 'National Maritime Police Agency') 
 Ministry of Justice
 Prosecution Service
 Provincial Prosecutors' Office
 Korea Immigration Service
 Border Control Division
 Investigation & Enforcement Division
 Korea Correctional Service
 National Intelligence Service (formerly the Korea Central Intelligence Agency [KCIA] and the Agency for National Security Planning [ANSP])

 The Korean National Police Agency 
Korean National Police Agency is composed of 1 deputy commissioner general, 8 bureaus, 9 offices and 32 divisions.

 Community Safety, Investigation Bureau, Traffic and Foreign Affairs Bureaus are responsible for basic policing. Public Security, Intelligence and National Security Bureaus govern public order. Spokesperson's Office, Planning and Coordination Office, Police Administration and Human Resources Office, Audit and Inspection Office, ICT and Equipment Policy Office, Scientific Investigation Office, Police Situation Control Center provide administrative support.
 Affiliated institutions include the Korean National Police University, Police Training Institute, Central Police Academy, Korean Police Investigation Academy and the National Police Hospital.
 Furthermore, the Korean National Police is regionally divided over the 18 metropolitan cities and provinces, placing 255 stations, 518 precincts and 1,433 police boxes under metropolitan and provincial police agencies

 General safety description 
The following list is a description of safety for citizens, tourists, and others who are related to being in South Korea.

 Emergency numbers: 112 for the police and 119 for the ambulance and fire department.
 For tourist they can call 1330 for the Korea Travel Hotline. This number is operated by the Korea Tourism Organization, where they can contact employees 24/7. Furthermore, this number is also available to request the help of translators to make you understandable, for example about taxi drivers or shop assistants.
 Pay attention to your personal belongings, like phone, wallet, money and credit cards.
 Travel and identity documents, like ID-card and passport should be kept in a safe place. Preferably bring a photocopy of travel documents. 
 Public demonstrations in South Korea, mostly in Seoul, happen often. Usually the demonstrations go out without any problems, but the atmosphere can change quickly and incident can happen. It has therefore best to avoid all demonstrations and large gatherings.

 Safety around the Demilitarized zone (DMZ) 
Since the end of the Korean War  in 1953, Korea has been divided between North Korea and South Korea, separated by a demilitarized zone, which the short name for is (DMZ).

 Take extra care and follow the advice of the local authorities.
 The DMZ is only accessible in an organized context.
 Visitors are accompanied militarily and it is strictly forbidden to leave the group.

 See also 
 Law of South Korea

References

 External links 
 Korea National Police Agency Official website 
 Seoul Metropolitan Police Agency Official website 
 Korea, South: Korean National Police—photius.com
 South Korea—A Comparative Criminology Tour of the World
 "SOUTH KOREA: Police brutality against protesting farmers must end"—Asian Human Rights Commission
 "Workers' Anger on the Rise in South Korea"—PICIS Newsletter'', no. 74, 4 July 2000
 Korean Police Operation 101 -Part 1: Contacting the Korean Police—naver.com blog